Lathyrus aureus, the golden pea, is a species of flowering plant in the pea family Fabaceae, native to Greece, Turkey, Armenia, Azerbaijan, Georgia, Russia, Kyrgyzstan, Moldova, Ukraine, Bulgaria, and Romania. In early summer this bushy herbaceous perennial produces many erect spikes of dusky yellow or orange flowers.

Lathyrus aureus is cultivated as an ornamental, for a sunny or partially shaded position in rich neutral or acid soil. As contact may cause mild indigestion, it is best handled with gloves.

References

Flora of Armenia
Flora of Azerbaijan
Flora of Bulgaria
Flora of Georgia (country)
Flora of Greece
Flora of Kyrgyzstan
Flora of Moldova
Flora of Romania
Flora of Russia
Flora of Turkey
Flora of Ukraine
aureus